Omm ol Tarfeh (also Romanized as Omm ol Ţarfeh and Omm oţ Ţorfeh; also known as Moţrafeh and Mutarfa) is a village in Mosharrahat Rural District, in the Central District of Ahvaz County, Khuzestan Province, Iran. At the 2006 census, its population was 189, in 31 families.

References 

Populated places in Ahvaz County